Richard Alleine (1610/11 – 22 December 1681) was an English Puritan divine.

Life
Alleine was born at Ditcheat, Somerset, in 1610 and baptised on the 18 October 1610, (where his father another Richard Alleine, born circa 1585 and died 1656, was rector). Richard, the son of Richard, was an older brother of William Alleine, born 1614, the saintly vicar of Blandford. Richard was educated at St Alban Hall, Oxford, where he was entered commoner in 1627, and whence, having taken the degree of B.A., he transferred himself to New Inn, continuing there until he proceeded M.A. On being ordained he became assistant to his father, and immediately stirred the entire county by his burning eloquence. On 14 October 1634, Richard Alleine was married by his father, the rector of St Mary Magdalene, Ditcheat, to a Lettice Gough born 1611 in Oxfordshire.

In March 1641 he succeeded the many-sided Richard Bernard as rector of Batcombe, Somerset. He declared himself on the side of the Puritans by subscribing "The testimony of the ministers in Somersetshire to the truth of Jesus Christ" and the Solemn League and Covenant, and assisted the commissioners of the parliament in their work of ejecting unsatisfactory ministers. Alleine continued for twenty years rector of Batcombe and was one of the two thousand ministers ejected in 1662. The Five Mile Act drove him to Frome Selwood, and in that neighborhood he preached until his death in 1681.

His works are all of a deeply spiritual character. His Vindiciae Pietatis (which first appeared in 1660) was refused license by Archbishop Sheldon, and was published, in common with other nonconformist books, without it. It was rapidly bought up and "did much to mend this bad world." Roger Norton, the king's printer, caused a large part of the first impression to be seized on the ground of its not being licensed and to be sent to the royal kitchen. Glancing over its pages, however, it seemed to him a sin that a book so holy and so salable should be destroyed. He therefore bought back the sheets, says the historian Edmund Calamy, for an old song, bound them and sold them in his own shop. This in turn was complained of, and he had to beg pardon on his knees before the council-table; and the remaining copies were sentenced to be " bisked," or rubbed over with an inky brush, and sent back to the kitchen for lighting fires. Such "bisked" copies occasionally occur still. The book was not killed. It was often reissued with additions, The Godly Man's Portion in 1663, Heaven Opened in 1666, The World Conquered in 1668. He also published a book of sermons.  John Wesley credited him as the originator of the covenant prayer that he introduced into Methodism in 1755.

Richard Alleine's daughter Theodosia married her cousin (to some degree), the ejected minister Joseph Alleine. She was said to have been "bred for work".

Works
A Brief Explanation of the Common Catechisme Distinguished into Three Parts, London, 1630
Vindiciæ Pietatis, London, 1660
Cheirothesia Tou Presbyteriou, or A Letter to a Friend, London, 1661
The Godly Mans Portion and Sanctuary, London, [1662?]
Heaven Opened, or, A Brief and Plain Discovery of the Riches of Gods Covenant by Grace, London, 1665
The Best of Remedies for the Worst of Maladies, London, 1667
The World Conquered, or A Believer's Victory Over the World, London, 1668
Two Prayers: One for the Use of Families, the Other for Children, [ca. 1670]
Godly-Fear, or, The Nature and Necessity of Fear, and its Usefulness, London, 1674
A Rebuke to Backsliders, and a Spurr for Loyterers, London, 1677
A Murderer Punished and Pardoned or, A True Relation of the Wicked Life, and Shameful-Happy Death of Thomas Savage, London, 1679
A Companion for Prayer, London, 1680
Instructions About Heart-Work, London, 1681
The Christian's Daily Practice of Piety, Edinburgh, 1703
The Voice of God to Christless Unregenerate Sinners, Boston, 1743

References

Attribution

Further reading

Stephen Wright, ‘Alleine, Richard (1610/11–1681)’, Oxford Dictionary of National Biography, Oxford University Press, 2004, accessed 17 Sept 2008

External links

English subscribers to the Solemn League and Covenant 1643
Ejected English ministers of 1662
1611 births
1681 deaths
People from Mendip District
Alumni of St Alban Hall, Oxford
Alumni of New Inn Hall, Oxford
English Calvinist and Reformed theologians
17th-century Calvinist and Reformed theologians